The 2017 CAMS Australian Formula 4 Championship is the third Australian Formula 4 Championship, a motor racing competition for open-wheel racing cars complying with Formula 4 regulations, which were created by the Fédération Internationale de l'Automobile (FIA) for entry-level open-wheel championships. Teams and drivers are competing in twenty-one races at six venues, starting on 8 April and ending on 22 October.

Teams and drivers
The following teams and drivers are scheduled to compete in the 2017 Australian Formula 4 Championship.
The following Australian-registered teams and drivers contested the championship.

Calendar

All rounds will support the Supercars Championship, with the exceptions of rounds one, two and four that will be featured within the Shannons Nationals.

Championship standings
Points are awarded to the top 10 classified finishers in each race.

Drivers' standings

References

External links

Australian F4 Championship seasons
Australian
F4
Australian Formula 4